Tell Afar could refer to the following places in the Middle East:

Tal Afar, a major city in northern Iraq
Tell Afar, Syria, a village in northern Syria